There are nine currencies of the European Union  used officially by member states. The euro accounts for the majority of the member states with the remainder operating independent monetary policies. Those European Union states that have adopted it are known as the eurozone and share the European Central Bank (ECB). The ECB and the national central banks of all EU countries, including those who operate an independent currency, are part of the European System of Central Banks.

Euro

The euro is the result of the European Union's project for economic and monetary union that came fully into being on 1 January 2002 and it is now the currency used by the majority of the European Union's member states, with all but Denmark (which has an opt-out in the EU treaties) bound to adopt it. It is the currency used by the institutions of the European Union and in the failed treaty on a European Constitution it was to be included with the symbols of Europe as the formal currency of the European Union. The euro is also widely used by other states outside the EU.

Except for Denmark, all current and future members of the EU are obliged to adopt the Euro as their currency, thus replacing their current ones. The relationship between euro and non-euro states has been on debate both during the United Kingdom's membership (as a large opt-out state) and in light of withdrawal from the EU and how that impacts the balance of power between the countries inside and those outside the eurozone, avoiding a eurozone caucus out-voting non-euro states. Former member United Kingdom had called for the EU treaties to recognise the EU as a "multicurrency union", which sparked concerns about undermining euro adoption in remaining countries.
The Great British Euro Conundrum, Handelsblatt 20 June 2016What a fair relationship between ‘euro ins’ and ‘euro outs’ could look like, London School of Economics 26 January 2016

Current currencies

The following are official and unofficial currencies used within the borders of the 27 EU Member states:

Note that there are other currencies used in overseas territories of member states. Those territories however are not part of the European Union proper (legally subject to all its law) so are not listed here.

Historic currencies

See also 
Economy of the European Union
List of currencies in Europe

Notes

References

Finance in the European Union